End of Flowers is a studio album by electronic band Diary of Dreams. It was released in 1996 on Accession Records.

Track listing

Credits
From Discogs.
 Artwork – Andreas Gantenhammer
 Lyrics by, music by, producer, arranged by, performer, recorded by, mastered by, artwork – Adrian Hates
 Mastered by [pre-mastering] – Christian Zimmerli
 Photography by – Silke Jochum
 Recorded and mastered at "White Room" / A.M.P. Studio.

References

1996 albums
Diary of Dreams albums
Accession Records albums